The secretary of state of South Carolina is an elected constitutional officer in the executive branch of government of the U.S. state of South Carolina. The secretary of state is the chief clerk of state government in South Carolina and is responsible for registering businesses and trademarks, regulating charities, cable franchises and railroads, commissioning notaries public, issuing apostilles, and serving as the filing office for municipal records and the official acts of the governor and legislature.

The incumbent is Mark Hammond, a Republican who has served as the secretary of state since 2003.

Salary
The secretary of state's salary is set at $92,007 annually, but will increase to $135,000 January 11, 2022.

Organization
The South Carolina Office of Secretary of State is responsible for the registration of companies, non-profit organizations, partnerships, employment agencies, state trademarks and business opportunities. The secretary of state also has the authority of issuing cable franchise applications and certificates, annexations of land, and investigations of counterfeit goods. The office is organized into five divisions: Business Filings, Trademarks, Charities, Notaries, and Cable Franchise. Each division promulgates regulations and files records relevant to taxpayers, businesses, charities, banks, local governments, and the state itself.

Business Filings Division
The Business Filing Division is accountable for filings for business corporations, nonprofit corporations, limited liability companies, limited partnerships, and limited liability partnerships.

The Uniform Commercial Code is another responsibility of the Business Filings Division, this Code conducts the  laws of commercial transactions. This includes the sale of goods, commercial paper, bank deposits and collections, letters of credit, bulk transfers, bills of lading and investment securities.

Trademarks Division
The Trademarks Division enforces a protection of copyrighted products and assists law enforcement in the seizing of any forged goods. According to the Secretary of State Accountability Report, about two million dollars of dishonorable merchandise was collected from fifty six individuals in the financial year from 2009 to 2010.

Public Charities Division
The Public Charities Division promotes and educations the public of charitable non profit organizations and sets regulations to maintain records in order to provide competent donations. Also the division investigates charities that violate the Solicitation of Charitable Funds Act. To further inform the public, Secretary Hammond formed the Secretary of State/Nonprofit Advisory Council. All charities in South Carolina must register and include a review of annual financial reports, and is susceptible to investigations and prosecutions. Those who do not register, do not file financial records, or mislead the public are fined. Files submitted to the Division of Public Charities are available to the public for inspection.

South Carolina Solicitation of Charitable Funds Act
The South Carolina Solicitation of Charitable Funds Act, or SC Act, was implemented by The Public Charities Division to regulated public charities to register and file financial reports. The SC Act specifies Charities Organizations as any organization that has a tax exemption from the IRS, recognizes itself as a charity, or employs a charitable appeal as the basis of solicitations. Charities must register to the Public Charities Division and file annual financial reports four months and two weeks after the charities fiscal year ending period.

Religious organizations funded privately, government grants, and political campaigns have are exemptible from the SC Act. Charities are also exemptible from registration and reporting if meets the conditions. The first condition is to not intend to solicit or accept donations from the public over $7,500 yearly.  The other condition is the exclusion of professional solicitors, professional fundraising, or commercial joint businesses and meets one of the circumstance: to not solicit over $20,000 in a year, received a letter of tax exemption from the IRS, and the cost of fundraising was a maximum of $500; any state or government agency affected by the Freedom of Information Act; a charted veterans organization; or an educational institute that only receive payment or donations from students, families, alumni, faculty, and friends.

Penalties for filing and annual updates are suspected to be fined, Notice of Solicitation Forms and Joint Financial Reports can cause $2000 fines per misdemeanor. Any persons who are intent to violate the SC Act may be fined up to $5,000 and given up to five years in jail. False information submitted intentionally can be fined up to $2,000 and imprisoned up to one year.

Notaries Division
The Notaries Division maintains apostilles and is responsible for all notary public applications. This division handles all filings for state boards and commissions. The secretary of state has the authority to verify the signature of any official is filed within the office.

Notary Public
A notary public is a person who is authorized to administer oaths, certify documents, perform official acts, and declare the credibility of signatures. To qualify as a notary public a candidate must be registered to vote in South Carolina thirty days before election. A term for a notary will serve for ten years and is commissioned with a certificate signed by the secretary of state.

Cable Franchise
The Cable Franchise Division has the authorizations to issue permits to cable companies.

Staff
According to the South Carolina Secretary of State Accountability Report, in 2010, twenty eight employees are staffed, twenty three as full-time employees, three as temporary employees, and two college interns.

Officeholders

See also
 Attorney General of South Carolina

References